This is a list of notable musical artists associated with the music genre of pop-punk.

Pop punk is a rock music genre that fuses elements of punk rock and power pop and pop. It typically combines punk’s fast tempos, loud and distorted electric guitars, and power chord changes with pop-influenced melodies, vocal styles, and lyrical themes.

0–9
 +44
 22 Jacks
 5 Seconds of Summer
 999

A 
 A
 A Day to Remember
 The Academy Is...
 Ace Troubleshooter
 Acceptance
 AFI
 Against the Current
A Change of Pace
 Alien Ant Farm
 Alkaline Trio
 A Loss for Words
 All
 The All-American Rejects
 All Time Low
 Allister
 Amber Pacific
 American Hi-Fi
 Army of Freshmen
 Anarbor
Artist vs. Poet
 As It Is
 Ash
 The Ataris
 The Audition
 Audio Karate
 August is Falling
 Autopilot Off
 Avril Lavigne

B
 Backstage Pass
 Beat Crusaders
Beat Union
 Better Luck Next Time
 Big Drill Car
 Billy Talent
 Blink-182
 Bodyjar
 Boris the Sprinkler
 Bomb the Music Industry!
 The Bouncing Souls
 Bowling for Soup
 Box Car Racer
 The Boys
 Boys Like Girls
 Bracket
 Brand New
 Broadside
Broadway Calls
 Busted
 Buzzcocks

C
 The Cab
 Carousel Kings
 Cartel
Cayetana
 Charli XCX
 Chasing Morgan
 Chixdiggit
City Lights
 Chunk! No, Captain Chunk!
 The Click Five  
 The Copyrights
 Count the Stars
 Courage My Love
 Crash Romeo
Crimpshrine
 Cub
Cute Is What We Aim For

D
 Daggermouth
 The Dangerous Summer
 David Crowder Band
 The Dead Milkmen
 Descendents
Destine
 The Donnas
Donots
 The Downtown Fiction
 Driving East
 Dum Dums
Dynamite Boy

E
 Eat Me Raw
 Every Avenue
 Eleventyseven
Ellegarden
 Elliot Minor
 Energy
 The Ergs!
 Eternal Boy
 Eve 6
 Even in Blackouts
 Everyday Sunday

F
 Faber Drive
 Face to Face
 Falling in Reverse
 Fall Out Boy
 Farewell
 Fenix TX
 Fight Fair
 Finley
 Fireworks
 Flatfoot 56
 Flop
 fluf
 FM Static
 Fonzie
Forever Came Calling
 Forever The Sickest Kids
 Four Year Strong
 The Friday Night Boys

G
 Generation X
 The Get Up Kids
 Ghoti Hook
 Go Betty Go
 Go Radio
 Gob
 Goldfinger
 Good Charlotte
 Goodnight Nurse
 Grayscale
 Green Day
 Greyfield
 Groovie Ghoulies
 Guttermouth

H
 Hagfish
 Halifax
 Handguns
 Hangnail
 Hawk Nelson
 Head Injuries
 Heart Attack Man 
 Hedley
 Hey Monday
 Hey Violet
 Hidden in Plain View
 The Hi-Fives
 The High Court
 The Higher
 The Hippos
 Hit the Lights
 Home Grown
 Hot Mulligan 
 House of Heroes
 Houston Calls
 The Huntingtons

I
 I Call Fives
 I Fight Dragons
 Icon for Hire
 Ivoryline

J
 The Jam
 Jawbreaker
 Jeff Rosenstock
 Jimmy Eat World
 June
 Just Surrender

K
 Karate High School
 Kid Down
Kids Can't Fly
 Kids in Glass Houses
 Kids in the Way
 Killerpilze
 Kiros
 Kisschasy
 Knuckle Puck
 Koopa

L
Lagwagon
 LANY
Latterman
Left Front Tire
 The Leftovers
 The Lemonheads
 Less Than Jake
 Lifesavors
Lifetime
 Light Years
 Like Pacific
 The Lillingtons
 Limbeck
 Lit
 Lola Ray
 Love You to Death
 Lucky 7
 Lucky Boys Confusion
 Ludo
 Lustra

M
 Machine Gun Kelly 
 Mach Pelican
 Magnapop
 The Maine
 Makeout
 Man Overboard
 Manges
 Marianas Trench
 Masked Intruder
 The Matches
 Mayday Parade
 McBusted
 McFly
 Me First and the Gimme Gimmes
 Melody Fall
 Mest
 The Methadones
 Midtown
 Millencolin
 Mixtapes
 Moose Blood
 Momoiro Clover Z
 Motion City Soundtrack
 Modern Baseball
 The Movielife
 The Mr. T Experience
 The Muffs
 MxPx
 My Chemical Romance

N
 Neck Deep
 Nerf Herder
 The New Cities
 New Found Glory
 New Years Day
 NOFX
 Noise By Numbers
 Not By Choice
 No Use for a Name

O
 October Fall
 The Offspring
 On My Honor
 One Ok Rock
 Orange
 Over It

P
 Paige
 Parasites
 Paramore
 Pardon Us
 Panic! at the Disco
 Patent Pending
 Permanent Me
 Pee Wee Gaskins
 Philmont
 Pierce the Veil
 Plain White T's
 Plinko
 Pointed Sticks
 Poor Old Lu
 The Presidents of the United States of America 
 Propagandhi
 Punchbuggy
 Punchline
 PUP

Q
 The Queers
 Quietdrive

R
 Ramones
 Rancid
 Real Friends
 Red City Radio
 The Red Jumpsuit Apparatus
 Reggie and the Full Effect
 Relient K
 Riddlin' Kids
 Roam
 Rookie of the Year
 Rudi 
 Rufio
 Run Kid Run

S
 Saves the Day
 Say Anything
Saving Aimee
 Scenes from a Movie
 Scott Murphy
 Screeching Weasel
 Seaway
 Senses Fail
 Set It Off
 Set Your Goals
 Shook Ones
 Short Stack
 Showoff
 Simple Plan
 Sleeping with Sirens
 Sleep On It
 Slick Shoes
Sludgeworth
 Smash Mouth
Smoking Popes
 Something Corporate
 Son of Dork
 The Soviettes
 Spanish Love Songs
 Sparks the Rescue
 Spazzys
 Split Habit
 SR-71
 Stand Atlantic
 The Starting Line
 State Champs
 Stellar Kart
 Stereos
Steriogram
 Stiff Dylans
 Story of the Year
 The Story So Far
Story Untold
 Student Rick
 Sugarcult
 Sum 41
 Supergrass
 Superman Is Dead
 The Summer Obsession
 The Summer Set
 Sweet Baby
 The Swellers

T
Tacocat
Taking Back Sunday
 Teen Idols
 Teenage Bottlerocket
 Ten Second Epic
 Terrible Things
 There for Tomorrow
 These Kids Wear Crowns
 This Century
 This Time Next Year
 Tigers Jaw
 Tilt
 Title Fight
 Tonight Alive
 Transit
 Trash Boat
 The Travoltas
 Treble Charger 
Trucks
 Twenty Twenty

U
 Undercover
 The Undertones
 The Unlovables
 Unwritten Law
 The Used

V
 Valencia
 The Vandals
 Vanilla Sky
 Verona Grove
Violent Delight

W
 Waterparks
 Wavves
 Wakefield
 We Are the in Crowd
 The Wedding
 Weezer
 We the Kings
 Wheatus
 With Confidence
 The Wonder Years
 The Wrecks
 WSTR

Y
 Yellowcard
 You, Me, And Everyone We Know 
 You Me at Six
 Yours Truly
Yungblud

Z
 Zebrahead
 Zolof the Rock and Roll Destroyer

See also
 List of pop punk albums

References

Lists of punk bands
Lists of pop musicians